Cheng Ming-chih (born 8 August 1979) is a Taiwanese para table tennis player. He won a silver medal at the 2016 Paralympics. 

He lost his left leg when he was 32, following an accident involving a drunk driver.

References 
 

1979 births 
Living people 
Table tennis players at the 2016 Summer Paralympics 
Medalists at the 2016 Summer Paralympics 
Sportspeople from Tainan 
Paralympic medalists in table tennis
Taiwanese male table tennis players 
Paralympic silver medalists for Chinese Taipei 
Paralympic table tennis players of Chinese Taipei 
Taiwanese amputees
Table tennis players at the 2020 Summer Paralympics
21st-century Taiwanese people